Within genetics, post-genomic research has rendered bacterial small non-coding RNAs (sRNAs) as major players in post-transcriptional regulation of gene expression in response to environmental stimuli. The Alphaproteobacteria includes Gram-negative microorganisms with diverse life styles; frequently involving long-term interactions with higher eukaryotes.

Sinorhizobium meliloti
Sinorhizobium meliloti is an agronomically relevant α-proteobacterium able to induce the formation of new specialized organs, the so-called nodules, in the roots of its cognate legume hosts (i.e. some Medicago species). Within the nodule cells bacteria undergo a morphology differentiation to bacteroid, their endosymbiotic nitrogen-fixing competent form. Rhizobial adaptations to soil and plant cell environments require the coordinate expression of complex gene networks in which sRNAs are expected to participate.

Discovery
Two complementary computational screens, eQRNA and RNAz, were used to search for novel sRNA-encoding genes in the intergenic regions  IGRs of S. meliloti. Verification of eQRNA/RNAz predictions by Northern hybridization and RACE mapping led to the identification of eight previously unknown genes, with recognizable promoter and termination signatures, expressing small transcripts. These new genomic loci were referred to as smr, for S. meliloti RNA. Seven of the Smr transcripts, which conservation is restricted to phylogenetically related Alphaproteobacteria, accumulated differentially in free-living and endosymbiotic bacteria. These findings anticipate a function for these sRNAs as trans-acting antisense riboregulators of Alphaproteobacteria-eukaryote interactions.

References

RNA
Genomics